The following is a list of British universities ordered by their financial endowments, expressed in pounds sterling at fair value. All sources are official audited financial statements published in the respective fiscal years. Note that changes to the Financial Reporting Standards (FRS 102) and Statement of Recommended Accounting Practice (SORP) in 2015 mean endowments as of 2016 are not directly comparable in all cases with those for previous years.

Endowments over £1 billion

Endowments from £250 million to £1 billion

Endowments from £100 million to £250 million

Endowments from £50 million to £100 million

Endowments from £25 million to £50 million

Endowments from £10 million to £25 million

Specialist Higher Education Institutions

Endowments per student greater than £10 thousand

{| class="wikitable sortable"
! Institution
! Total enrolment (2020/21)
! Endowment per capita (2021, student population over 1000)
|-
|University of Cambridge (inc colleges)
| 22,155
| £321,417
|-
|University of Oxford (inc colleges)
| 27,150
| £270,015
|-
|London Business School
| 2,460
| £23,550
|-
|London School of Hygiene & Tropical Medicine
| 1,105
| £18,646
|-
|London School of Economics
| 13,455
| £17,900
|-
|University of Edinburgh
| 37,830
| £14,941
|-
|University of St Andrews
| 11,485
| £10,251
|-
|}

Endowments below £10 million

See also 
 Armorial of UK universities
 List of universities in the United Kingdom
 List of UK universities by date of foundation
 List of universities in the United Kingdom by enrolment
 Lists of institutions of higher education by endowment size

Notes

References

Universities in the United Kingdom
Education finance in the United Kingdom
United Kingdom
Endowment